Cub Creek is a  long 1st order tributary to South Hyco Creek in Person County, North Carolina.  Cub Creek joins South Hyco Creek within Hyco Lake.

Course
Cub Creek rises about 1 mile southeast of Leasburg, North Carolina and then flows northeast to join South Hyco Creek about 1.5 miles south-southwest of Longs Store.

Watershed
Cub Creek drains  of area, receives about 46.4 in/year of precipitation, has a wetness index of 385.84, and is about 57% forested.

References

Rivers of North Carolina
Rivers of Person County, North Carolina
Tributaries of the Roanoke River